Rolf Bremer (July 4, 1926 – May 5, 1991) was a German politician of the Christian Democratic Union (CDU) and former member of the German Bundestag.

Life 
Bremer joined the CDU, had been chairman of the CDU district association in Pinneberg since 1965 and was elected to the state executive of the CDU Schleswig-Holstein in 1967. Bremer was a member of the German Bundestag from 1965 to 1976. He was directly elected to the Bundestag in 1965 as a member of parliament for the Pinneberg constituency and then always entered the Bundestag via the Schleswig-Holstein state list.

Literature

References

1926 births
1991 deaths
Members of the Bundestag for Schleswig-Holstein
Members of the Bundestag 1972–1976
Members of the Bundestag 1969–1972
Members of the Bundestag 1965–1969
Members of the Bundestag for the Christian Democratic Union of Germany